Barbara Kyagulanyi (born September 7, 1984) is a Ugandan philanthropist and author. She is the wife to Ugandan pop artist and politician Robert Kyagulanyi Ssentamu, alias Bobi Wine. She is the author of 
"Golden Memories of a Village Belle" published in 2012.

In 2013, she founded Caring Hearts Uganda, an NGO with a focus on Girl child leadership empowerment, HIV/AIDS, Menstrual hygiene and girl child education where she teaches girls traditional values, malaria eradication, life-long education, personal development and entrepreneurial skills to promote sustainable development for the youths. As such, she, through her NGO, has donated infrastructure to school for the internally displaced children and marginalized children.

Barbie entered active politics in 2018 to support and campaign for her husband Bobi Wine to become a member of parliament and later for presidency in 2020 with her manifesto about the welfare of women, children, and the youths. She fought for the release of Bobi Wine when he was jailed at Nalufenya during his presidential campaigns in 2020 and was praised by the media when she told the BBC that the struggle for change wasn't about her or her family but rather about the oppressed people of Uganda. She was later put under house arrest with her husband Bobi Wine. He also advocated for the end to military court martial to which civilians had been subjected.

Personal life
Barbie was born on the September 7, 1984, in Ntungamo District, South Western Uganda. Her parents are Doctors Gershom Kagaju and Joy Kagaju. She attended St. Hellen's Primary School, Nyamitanga in Mbarara, Bweranyangi Girl's school for her O and A levels for six years. She then joined Makerere University where she studied Social work and Social Administration. She also completed a master's degree  in Human Rights at the University of London. Barbie met Bobi Wine when she was in high school while Bobi was a student of Music Dance and Drama at Makerere University. The two got married in 2011 at Rubaga Cathedral in Kampala after living together for 10 years and they have four children.

Awards
Barbara was awarded for her vocational Service Award by the Bugolobi Rotaract Club In 2018, she received an award for Excellence in Leadership award by The AidChild Leadership institute/Uganda. In 2020, she was awarded The teen's most favorite social media star by Teenz Awards 2020. She was also awarded for supporting teen mothers by The Remnant Generation, an award that counsels and supports teem mothers in Uganda.

References

External links

Website 

1982 births
Living people
People from Ntungamo District
People from Western Region, Uganda
Ugandan businesspeople
Ugandan writers
Bweranyangi Girls Senior Secondary School